Women in space describes the particular challenges faced by women traveling and working in space. Women in space may also refer to:

Chinese women in space, a history of female astronauts in China
Mercury 13, a privately funded effort to train women as astronauts in the mid-20th century

See also
List of female astronauts
Spacewoman (disambiguation)